Eugene F. Rivers III is an American activist, and Pentecostal minister based in Boston, Massachusetts.

Biography 

Eugene Franklin Rivers, III, was born in Boston, Massachusetts, on April 9, 1950.  His parents were Eugene F. Rivers II and Mildred Bell Rivers. He grew up in Chicago, Illinois, and Philadelphia, Pennsylvania, graduating high school from the Murrell Dobbins Vocational High School in 1968. He was a gang member in Philadelphia, but left the gang, after being mentored by Reverend Benjamin Smith, the pastor of Deliverance Evangelistic Temple. Rivers wanted to be a painter, and enrolled at the Pennsylvania Academy of Fine Arts. While a student, he increased his involvement in grassroots activism in Philadelphia and beyond.  He joined Black Church-affiliated movements working on black liberation, economic empowerment and urban redevelopment. He was connected with the Black Economic Development Conference, and supported James Forman's efforts to obtain reparations from churches and synagogues in the United States.

Rivers moved to Boston, and began studying at Harvard College in 1976.  In 1984, he founded the Azusa Christian Community in Dorchester, serving as pastor.  He also founded the Ella J. Baker House, in Dorchester, as a community youth center.  Concerned about gang violence, and the high number of youth being killed by gun violence, he joined with other black clergy to found the Boston TenPoint Coalition in 1992.  The Coalition's efforts succeeded in reducing violence in Boston's neighborhoods, and led to what has been called the "Boston Miracle." Rivers became co-chair of the National TenPoint Leadership Foundation, and was widely seen as an expert on strategies for reducing urban violence that impacts African Americans.

Rivers served as an advisor to Presidents George H.W. Bush in urban issues.  He has appeared on national television shows, including Hardball with Chris Matthews with Michael Rogers defending Rick Warren. He was featured on the cover of Newsweek Magazine in 1998, and he was written about in Commonwealth Magazine 1999. He is also an adviser to Bishop Charles Blake for Save Africa's Children. His wife, Jacqueline Rivers, did her PhD at Harvard University under the tutelage of Orlando Patterson.

Rivers' essay The Responsibility of Black Intellectuals in the Age of Crack published under the new editorship of Joshua Cohen in the Boston Review led to extensive debate in and around intellectual circles in New England.

References

External links
Ryan Sorba and Dinesh D'Souza Discuss the Side-Effects of Social Programs...and expand on River's words
Boston Phoenix: Eugene Rivers’s moment: Under fire for challenging Jesse Jackson, the street minister says the real challenge is to work with the Bushies in crafting a new, post-civil-rights agenda Date of publication uncertain
Christianity Today. Feb. 5, 1996, CT Classic: Separate and Equal - Martin Luther King dreamed of an integrated society. Boston minister Eugene Rivers thinks it was the wrong dream, by Wendy Murray Zoba
Religion and Ethnics Newsweekly, November 11, 2005, Episode no. 911: Lucky Severson's interview with the Reverend Eugene Rivers in Boston, Massachusetts
The Boston Phoenix, July 17 - 24, 1997 - The Future of Boston - The Reverend Eugene Rivers
The Boston Strategy to Prevent Youth Violence - Reverend Eugene Rivers

American Pentecostals
Living people
African-American activists
African-American Christian clergy
American Christian clergy
Year of birth missing (living people)